The Battle of Trenton was fought on December 26, 1776, during the American Revolutionary War campaign for New Jersey.  In a surprise attack, the Continental Army led by George Washington attacked the winter quarters of a brigade composed primarily of German troops from Hesse-Kassel in Trenton, New Jersey.  The Hessian brigade was under the command of Colonel Johann Rall; he died of wounds sustained in the battle, and about two thirds of his men were taken prisoner.  It was the first major victory after a long string of defeats that had resulted in the loss of New York City, and was a significant boost to American morale.  It was followed by two more American victories, first in a second battle at Trenton on January 2, 1777, and then on January 3 at Princeton.

Most of the German brigade comprised three Hessian regiments: those of Rall, von Lossberg, and von Knyphausen.  The remainder of the brigade consisted of artillery corps attached to each regiment, a detachment of Jäger, and a small company of British dragoons.  The attacking American army consisted of units from the Continental Army, including companies of its artillery, and a few companies of militia.  Additional units were intended to also participate either in the attack, or in diversions to draw attention from the main thrust; these units failed to cross the icy Delaware River and did not participate in the action.

Hesse-Kassel and British Army

After the war broke out in 1775, the British government realized that it would need more troops than it could raise on its own to fight the war, so it sought to hire troops from willing third parties in Europe.  All of these hired troops came from German principalities of the Holy Roman Empire.  The single largest contingent, with more than 12,000 arriving in North America in 1776, came from the Landgraviate of Hessen-Kassel.  The garrison that was quartered at Trenton was a brigade of about 1,400 men, almost all from Hesse-Kassel, under the command of Colonel Johann Rall.  The brigade was composed of three regiments, each of which had an artillery company attached.  Also included in the brigade were a company of Hessian Jäger (basically light infantry) and a small company from the British 16th (Queen's) Light Dragoons.

The Hessian regiments were named for their formal commanding officers.  Since many general officers were also commissioned as colonels of regiments, they were often not present with the regiment, or were busy with their other duties even if the regiment fell under their higher-level command.  Since Rall commanded the entire brigade, his regiment's operations were directed by its lieutenant colonel, as were the regiments of Lieutenant Generals Wilhelm von Knyphausen and Friedrich Wilhelm von Lossberg, the second and third ranking general officers in the North American forces of Hesse-Kassel after Lieutenant General Leopold Philip von Heister.

The information in this table is based primarily on the reports of surviving Hessian officers submitted during inquiries into the disaster demanded by Frederick II, the Landgrave of Hesse-Kassel, with some estimates provided by David Hackett Fischer and other historians.  The reported strengths do not include the 28 regimental officers.  The casualty figures are from an official Hessian return (a formal report on the unit's strength) that also does not include officers.  Officers killed or who died of their wounds included Col. Johann Rall and Maj. Friedrich von Dechow, the acting commander of the Knyphausen regiment.

Continental Army

Washington organized his army into two columns for the attack on Trenton.  After crossing the Delaware River, Brigadier General Adam Stephen's troops guarded the bridgehead while the remaining troops crossed.  The divisions marched together for several miles before taking different roads into Trenton. Stephen's men led Major General Nathanael Greene's division southward along an inland road (which was accompanied by Washington and his entourage), while Major General John Sullivan's division followed a road along the river, intending to prevent the Hessians from retreating across the Assunpink Creek.

Most of the figures in this listing are derived from a return prepared by George Washington on December 22, 1776, four days before the battle.  Historian David Hackett Fischer includes estimates made by either himself or other historians for strength counts that were not provided in Washington's return.  The counts include all officers and musicians, in addition to the rank and file marked as present and fit for duty.  Washington required everyone to carry muskets, including officers and musicians who did not normally carry them. Also, a few Marines under Major Samuel Nicholas were in the battle.

American casualties in the battle were very light, and are therefore not listed in the table below.  Two Virginia officers, Capt. William Washington and Lt. James Monroe of the 3rd Virginia Regiment, were injured, as was James Buxton, an ensign in the 4th Virginia Regiment.  (Monroe, the future United States president, suffered a wound to the neck that very nearly killed him.  His life was saved by a doctor who volunteered his services to the army as it marched through New Jersey that morning.) Two privates are known to have died in the battle, and one account includes mention of two men dying from exposure on the march.  The most pessimistic estimate of American casualties lists four killed and eight wounded, although Fischer points out that many more American troops probably died of non-combat causes (including illness, hypothermia, malnutrition, and exhaustion) in the days and weeks following the campaign of late December and early January.

Other American units in the campaign

Although the main Continental Army force was the only American formation involved in the attack on Trenton, Washington had planned two additional crossings of the Delaware to assist in the attack.  Pennsylvania militia Brigadier General John Cadwalader's brigade, composed of militia companies called associators and a number of smaller Continental Army regiments, did get some units across the river at Dunk's Ferry, but ice jams on the far side made it impossible to cross everyone, including Cadwalader and the artillery, and the effort was abandoned. Pennsylvania brigadier James Ewing was unable to cross any of his troops (militia companies that had been assigned to the reserve force known as the Flying Camp earlier in the year) due to difficult icy conditions at the Trenton Ferry.  Ewing's artillery did fire across the river during the battle.

Notes

References

 
 
 
 
 
 
 
 

American Revolutionary War orders of battle
New Jersey in the American Revolution